Joseph Lane (1801–1881) was an American general and United States Senator from Oregon.

Joseph or Joe Lane may also refer to:

Joseph Lane, birth name of actor Nathan Lane
Joseph Lane (socialist) (1851–1920), English libertarian socialist
Joseph R. Lane (1858–1931), United States Representative from Iowa
Joe Lane (footballer) (1892–1959), English professional footballer
Joe Lane (singer) (1927–2007), Australian jazz vocalist
Joe Lane (Arizona politician) (1935–2014), American politician
Joe Lane (cartoonist) (1911–2009), American cartoonist